The branched-chain α-ketoacid dehydrogenase complex (BCKDC or BCKDH complex) is a multi-subunit complex of enzymes that is found on the mitochondrial inner membrane. This enzyme complex catalyzes the oxidative decarboxylation of branched, short-chain alpha-ketoacids. BCKDC is a member of the mitochondrial α-ketoacid dehydrogenase complex family comprising pyruvate dehydrogenase and alpha-ketoglutarate dehydrogenase, key enzymes that function in the Krebs cycle.

Coenzymes
This complex requires the following 5 coenzymes:
Thiamine pyrophosphate
Lipoate (lipoic acid)
Coenzyme A
Flavin adenine dinucleotide (FAD)
Nicotinamide adenine dinucleotide (NAD+)

Biological function
In animal tissue, BCKDC catalyzes an irreversible step in the catabolism of the branched-chain amino acids L-isoleucine, L-valine, and L-leucine, acting on their deaminated derivatives (L-alpha-keto-beta-methylvalerate, alpha-ketoisovalerate, and alpha-ketoisocaproate, respectively) and converting them to α-Methylbutyryl-CoA, Isobutyryl-CoA and Isovaleryl-CoA respectively. In bacteria, this enzyme participates in the synthesis of branched, long-chain fatty acids. In plants, this enzyme is involved in the synthesis of branched, long-chain hydrocarbons.

The overall catabolic reaction catalyzed by the BCKDC is shown in Figure 1.

Structure
The mechanism of enzymatic catalysis by the BCKDC draws largely upon the elaborate structure of this large enzyme complex. This enzyme complex is composed of three catalytic components: alpha-ketoacid dehydrogenase (also referred to as the E1 component), dihydrolipoyl transacylase (E2 component), and dihydrolipoamide dehydrogenase (E3 component). In humans, 24 copies of E2 arranged in octahedral symmetry form the core of the BCKDC. Non-covalently linked to this polymer of 24 E2 subunits are 12 E1 α2β2 tetramers and 6 E3 homodimers.  In addition to the E1/E3-binding domain, there are 2 other important structural domains in the E2 subunit: (i) a lipoyl-bearing domain in the amino-terminal portion of the protein and (ii) an inner-core domain in the carboxy-terminal portion. The inner-core domain is linked to the other two domains of the E2 subunit by two interdomain segments (linkers). The inner-core domain is necessary to form the oligomeric core of the enzyme complex and catalyzes the acyltransferase reaction (shown in the "Mechanism" section below). The lipoyl domain of E2 is free to swing between the active sites of the E1, E2, and E3 subunits on the assembled BCKDC by virtue of the conformational flexibility of the aforementioned linkers (see Figure 2). Thus, in terms of function as well as structure, the E2 component plays a central role in the overall reaction catalyzed by the BCKDC.

The role of each subunit is as follows:

E1 subunit
E1 uses thiamine pyrophosphate (TPP) as a catalytic cofactor. E1 catalyzes both the decarboxylation of the α-ketoacid and the subsequent reductive acylation of the lipoyl moiety (another catalytic cofactor) that is covalently bound to E2.

E2 subunit
E2 catalyzes a transfer of the acyl group from the lipoyl moiety to coenzyme A (a stoichiometric cofactor).

E3 subunit
The E3 component is a flavoprotein, and it re-oxidizes the reduced lipoyl sulfur residues of E2 using FAD (a catalytic cofactor) as the oxidant. FAD then transfers these protons and electrons to NAD+ (a stoichiometric cofactor) to complete the reaction cycle.

Mechanism
As previously mentioned, BCKDC’s primary function in mammals is to catalyze an irreversible step in the catabolism of branched-chain amino acids. However, the BCKDC has a relatively broad specificity, also oxidizing 4-methylthio-2-oxobutyrate and 2-oxobutyrate at comparable rates and with similar Km values as for its branched-chain amino acid substrates. The BCKDC will also oxidize pyruvate, but at such a slow rate this side reaction has very little physiological significance.

The reaction mechanism is as follows. Please note that any of several branched-chain α-ketoacids could have been used as a starting material; for this example, α-ketoisovalerate was arbitrarily chosen as the BCKDC substrate.

NOTE: Steps 1 and 2 occur in the E1 domain

STEP 1: α-ketoisovalerate combines with TPP and is then decarboxylated. The proper arrow-pushing mechanism is shown in Figure 3.

STEP 2: The 2-methylpropanol-TPP is oxidized to form an acyl group while being simultaneously transferred to the lipoyl cofactor on E2. Note that TPP is regenerated. The proper arrow-pushing mechanism is shown in Figure 4.

NOTE: The acylated lipoyl arm now leaves E1 and swings into the E2 active site, where Step 3 occurs.

STEP 3: Acyl group transfer to CoA. The proper arrow-pushing mechanism is shown in Figure 5.

*NOTE: The reduced lipoyl arm now swings into the E3 active site, where Steps 4 and 5 occur.

STEP 4: Oxidation of the lipoyl moiety by the FAD coenzyme, as shown in Figure 6.

STEP 5: Reoxidation of FADH2 to FAD, producing NADH:
FADH2 + NAD+ --> FAD + NADH + H+

Disease relevance
A deficiency in any of the enzymes of this complex as well as an inhibition of the complex as a whole leads to a buildup of branched-chain amino acids and their harmful derivatives in the body. These accumulations lend a sweet smell to bodily excretions (such as ear wax and urine), leading to a pathology known as maple syrup urine disease.

This enzyme is an autoantigen recognized in primary biliary cirrhosis, a form of acute liver failure. These antibodies appear to recognize oxidized protein that has resulted from inflammatory immune responses. Some of these inflammatory responses are explained by gluten sensitivity. Other mitochondrial autoantigens
include pyruvate dehydrogenase and branched-chain oxoglutarate dehydrogenase, which are antigens recognized by anti-mitochondrial antibodies.

Mutations of the BCKDK gene, whose protein product controls the activity of the complex, may result in over-activation of the complex and excessive catabolism of the three amino acids. This leads to branched-chain keto acid dehydrogenase kinase deficiency, a rare disease first described in humans in 2012.

References

External links
 GeneReviews/NCBI/NIH/UW entry on Maple Syrup Urine Disease
 
 
 

Autoantigens